Islam was the first Abrahamic monotheistic religion to arrive in Ivory Coast. Today, it is the most widely professed religion in the country, representing 60 percent of the total population.

As of the late 1980s, only the most devout Muslims in Ivory Coast prayed, fasted, and gave alms as required by strict tenets of Islam, and only the most wealthy performed the hajj. Most Ivoirian Muslims are Sunni, following the Maliki version of Islamic law. Sufism, involving the organization of mystical brotherhoods (Tariqa) for the purification and spread of Islam, is also widespread, laced with indigenous beliefs and practices. The four major Sufi brotherhoods are all represented in Ivory Coast, although the Qadiriya, founded in the eleventh century, and the Tidjaniya, founded in the eighteenth century, are most popular. The Qadiriya is prevalent in the west, and the Tidjaniya, in the east. The other two major Islamic brotherhoods have few adherents in Ivory Coast. The Senoussiya is identified with Libya, where its influence is substantial. Ahmadiyya movement is also present in Ivory Coast.

The significant religious authority is the marabout. He is believed to be a miracle worker, a physician, and a mystic, who exercises both magical and moral authority. He is also respected as a dispenser of amulets, which protect the wearer—Muslim or non-Muslim—against evil. The influence of marabouts has produced a number of reactions in Ivoirian society, among them a series of reformist movements. These reform movements often condemn Sufism and marabouts as un-Islamic, but the poor see that marabouts often speak out on behalf of the downtrodden.

Hamallism began as an Islamic reform movement in the French Sudan early in the twentieth century and has provided a channel for expressing political and religious discontent. Its founder, Hamallah, was exiled from the French Sudan to Ivory Coast during the 1930s. He preached Islamic reform tempered by tolerance of many local practices, but he condemned many aspects of Sufism. Orthodox brotherhoods were able to convince the French authorities in Ivory Coast that Hamallah had been responsible for earlier political uprisings in the French Sudan. Authorities then expelled Hamallah from Ivory Coast and banned his teachings.

The massive immigration of Muslims from the Muslim majority countries Burkina Faso and Mali helped to increase the number of Muslims substantially.

According to Pew Forum the population of Shia in Ivory Coast is less than one percent of the total Muslim population of Ivory Coast while as per Imam Husayn (as) Encyclopedia the population of Shia in Ivory Coast is around five percent of the total Muslim population of Ivory Coast.

See also
 Religion in Ivory Coast

References